Malmi is a regional center and a major district on the north-eastern part of Helsinki, Finland. It has a population of 24,312 (2008). The Malmi District is divided into six subareas, two of which are the center forming Ylä-Malmi ("Upper Malmi") and Ala-Malmi ("Lower Malmi"), and the rest are Pihlajamäki, Tattariharju, Malmin lentokenttä (Malmi airport) and Pihlajisto. Malmin peruspiiri is a related but distinct subdivision of Helsinki (used for certain administrative purposes) which does not include Pihlajamäki and Pihlajisto, but instead includes Tapanila and Tapaninvainio. The population of this area is approximately 27,800.

Its main transport links include the main railway dividing the city center into Ylä-Malmi and Ala-Malmi, as well as the ring road called Ring I in the southern part of the district. Along the railway, Malmi has its own railway station. The Malmi Airport is located in the eastern part of the district. Also, Malmi is home to the Malmi Cemetery, the largest cemetery of Finland. The Malmi shooting range hosted the pistol and rifle shooting events of the 1952 Summer Olympics.

Etymology
The name of Malmi appears in old documents in the forms Malm (1543), Malmby (1551), Malme (1589), Malmsby (1590) and Malmn (1592). The name is the same as the word malm in the Swedish dialects of Uusimaa, meaning flat and sandy forest land. The word refers in particular to a wooded somersault above its surroundings, such as a gravel ridge. The word has been common in the parish of Helsinki, judging by the names of the 18th century, such as Keimola's Tappermalm, Voutila–Viinikkala's Mottmalm, Tikkurila–Hakkila's Haxmalm and Länsisalmi's Brändmalm and Sandmalm. The Finnish counterparts Malmi and Malminkylä came into use at the end of the 19th century. Among the old farms in Malminkylä, Paavolantie, Pietiläntie, Vilppulantie, Yrjölänkuja and Örskinkuja have been preserved in the street name. The original form of the name Ormusmäki is Orrmossebacken. In English, Malmi literally means ore.

Gallery

See also
 Itäkeskus
 Pakila
 Viikki

References

External links

Venues of the 1952 Summer Olympics
Olympic shooting venues